Brahampur is a small village in Bounsi city under Banka district of Bihar, India. It comes under the administration of in Bounsi (or Bounsi) gram panchayat Bagdumba of Banka district.

The local language is Angika. The Pin Code is 813104. This village consist 70% population of Maithil Brahmins. There are more than 100 houses and 90% of them are cement and rest are huts.  The population is nearly 400.

This village is surrounded by land and fields with different kinds of trees, which makes the air and environment pure and fresh. Brahampur bounded with a few villages: Sirai, Barmania, Rani and Acharaj.

References

Villages in Bhagalpur district